Emerald Peak may refer to the following mountain summits:
Emerald Peak (California), in Kings Canyon National Park, in the Sierra Nevada range
Emerald Peak (Colorado), in San Isabel National Forest, in the Sawatch Range
Emerald Peak (Washington), in Glacier Peak Wilderness, in the Chelan Mountains
Emerald Peak (Yoho), British Columbia, in the Canadian Rockies